Christopher Higgins, best known by his stage name Higgins X-13 (born September 23, 1972), is an American musician, former backup guitar/vocal/keyboard/percussion player in the punk rock band The Offspring from 1994 to 2005. He provided backing vocals for Offspring's studio albums between Americana and Rise and Fall, Rage and Grace. During his 11 years with the band, he performed live with the Offspring on tour and made an appearance in the music video for "Why Don't You Get a Job?". When the Offspring was not on the road Higgins ran the lead singer's studio and produced the demo recording of upcoming Offspring albums. Higgins also played guitar and did some vocals in the bands Gentleman Jack, All the Madmen (Working Class Zeroes) and Good Kitty.

As of 2005, he is no longer with The Offspring on the tour but he did backup vocals on Rise and Fall, Rage and Grace. It is said that he needs more time with his church and family. He is currently involved in digital media and visual communications at St. John's Lutheran Church of Orange, California.

In 2017 Higgins joins the recently reformed WANK. a 90's Orange County ska-punk phenomenon who's most well know song FORGIVEN still gets a respectable amount of play. In 1998 WANK was signed to Madonna’s former label Maverick Records with the help of Mike Ness from Social Distortion, re-releasing their debut album Get a Grip on Yourself.  Higgins appears on WANK's 2018 release White Knuckle Ride and the 2022 Single THE STATES and more. WANK briefly worked with Die Laughing Records in 2019 and played various shows form 2015 through 2020 when we were all forced to take a break.

Discography

With The Offspring

Studio albums
1998 — Americana
2000 — Conspiracy of One
2003 — Splinter
2008 — Rise and Fall, Rage and Grace

With AFI

Studio albums
2000 — The Art of Drowning (backing vocals)

With T.S.O.L.

Studio albums
2003 — Divided We Stand (backing vocals)

References

External links

1972 births
Living people
American punk rock guitarists
American punk rock bass guitarists
American rock keyboardists
American rock percussionists
American male bass guitarists
21st-century American bass guitarists
21st-century American male musicians